Wiktor Tomir Drymmer (1896–1975) was a Polish Army colonel and intelligence officer.

Career
During World War I, Drymmer was a soldier in the Polish Legions and the Polish Military Organization.

After the war, he became an officer in Section II (the intelligence section) in the General Staff of the Polish Armed Forces, then an official in the Presidium of the Council of Ministers, director of the Ministry of Foreign Affairs Consular Department, and one of the closest collaborators of Foreign Minister Józef Beck.

During the Interbellum he also became chief of the secret K-7 organization, which had developed from an initiative of Edmund Charaszkiewicz's and which supervised certain Polish covert operations.

After World War II, he remained abroad.

See also
Edmund Charaszkiewicz
List of Poles

Notes

References
Edmund Charaszkiewicz, Zbiór dokumentów ppłk. Edmunda Charaszkiewicza (A Collection of Documents by Lt. Col. Edmund Charaszkiewicz), edited and with introduction and notes by Andrzej Grzywacz, Marcin Kwiecień, Grzegorz Mazur, Kraków, Księgarnia Akademicka, 2000, .
Wiktor Tomir Drymmer, W służbie Polsce (In Service to Poland), Warsaw, 1998.

1896 births
1975 deaths
Polish intelligence officers
Polish military attachés